The men's 5000 metres at the 1998 European Athletics Championships was held at the Népstadion on 22 August.

Medalists

Results

Final

References

Results
Results
Results

5000
5000 metres at the European Athletics Championships